The French Doll is a 1923 American silent comedy drama film directed by Robert Z. Leonard and starring Mae Murray, Orville Caldwell and Rod La Rocque. It was based on a French-language novel by Paul Armont and Marcel Gerbidon.

Cast
 Mae Murray as Georgine Mazulier
 Orville Caldwell as Wellington Wick
 Rod La Rocque as Pedro Carrova
 Rose Dione as Madame Mazuloier
 Paul Cazeneuve as Monsieur Mazulier
 Willard Louis as Joseph Dumas
 Bernard Randall as Snyder
 Lucien Littlefield as Dobbs, the Butler

References

Bibliography
 Goble, Alan. The Complete Index to Literary Sources in Film. Walter de Gruyter, 1999.

External links
 

1923 films
1923 comedy-drama films
American silent feature films
American black-and-white films
Films directed by Robert Z. Leonard
Tiffany Pictures films
Metro Pictures films
1920s English-language films
1920s American films
Silent American comedy-drama films